Northern Failures is an album by American metal band Cable, released in 2001 by Hydra Head Records.  The album was produced by Steve Austin of Today Is The Day, the first of three releases he would produce for the group, and the band's last record for Hydra Head Records.  "Can't You See" is Marshall Tucker Band cover.  According to drummer Vic Szalaj, much of the album, from its title to the lyrics, were inspired by a 10-day trip he and bassist/vocalist Randy Larsen took to the White Mountains in New Hampshire.

Track listing
All tracks written by Cable except #11.
 "Wings of Hope" – 2:50
 "The Big Rock" – 2:54
 "Climb the Cactus" – 6:25
 "Irish Tan" – 3:24
 "The City Dump" – 2:34
 "Black Leather Mustache" – 3:10
 "Fours and Whores" – 1:59
 "Happy Accidents" – 4:57
 "Whiskey Mountain Mantra" – 4:19
 "Homewrecker" – 5:13
 "Can't You See" – 5:14

Personnel
 Randy Larsen - vocals, bass
 Bernie Romanowski - guitar
 Vic Szalaj - drums

References

Cable (American band) albums
2001 albums
Hydra Head Records albums